The Site Waste Management Plans Regulations 2008 were laid before the UK Parliament on 15 February 2008, and came into full force on 6 April 2008. The regulations do not apply to any project planned before 6 April, if construction work commenced before 1 July 2008, and apply only to projects in England.

The Site Waste Management Plans Regulations were repealed by Government on 1 December 2013 following a consultation, as part of the Government's initiative to reduce red tape.

They applied to all projects with a value of £300,000 or more, with additional updating requirements for projects with a value of £500,000 or more.

The regulations placed the initial responsibility for the production of the plan with the client. The client had to produce the plan before the project was started. If a project was started without a site waste management plan, then both the client and the principal contractor were guilty of an offence under these regulations. The regulations also laid out what the plan had to include.

Requirements for a site waste management plan
The plan must identify:

 The client
 The principal contractor
 The person who drafted it
 The location of the site
 The estimated cost of the project

It must record any decision made in order to minimise the quantity of waste produced on site before the plan was drafted.

It must:
 Describe each waste expected to be produced
 Estimate the quantity of each type of waste
 Identify the waste management action for each type of waste including re-using, recycling, recovery of disposal.

It must also contain a declaration that both the client and the principal contractor will comply with the requirements of duty of care and that materials will be handled efficiently and waste managed appropriately.

Updating the plan
Once the project starts then the regulations place an obligation on the principal contractor to update the plan. If the project has a value of they must record details of the identity of the person removing the wastes, the types of waste removed and the site the waste is being taken to. They must also, within three months of the completion of the project, add a confirmation that wastes have been monitored and the plan updated to reflect any changes along with an explanation of any deviation from the plan.

If the project is worth more than £500,000, then these requirements include further, more clearly defined, duty of care information. The principal contractor must also:

 Review the plan
 Record quantities and types of waste produced
 Record the types and quantities of waste that have been:
 Reused (on or off site)
 Recycled (on or off site)
 Sent of other forms of recovery (on or off site)
 Sent to landfill
 Otherwise disposed of
 Update the plan to reflect the progress of the project

Within three months of the work being completed the principal contractor must add to the plan:

 Confirmation that the plan has been monitored and updated in accordance with the regulation
 A comparison of estimated quantities of each type of waste generated against the actual quantities of each waste type
 An explanation of any deviation from the plan
 An estimate of the cost savings that have been achieved by completing and implementing the plan.

The principal contractor must ensure that the plan is kept on site, and every contractor knows where it is kept. It must be available to any contractor carrying any work described in the plan.

The principal contractor must retain the plan for two years following the completion of the project.

Additional duties
In addition to the requirements laid out in the regulations the client and principal contractor must, so far as is reasonably practicable, comply with a number of additional duties laid out in the schedule to the regulations.

These include:
 Ensuring cooperation between contractors during the construction phase.
 Induction, information and training for every worker, with respect to the site waste management plan.
 Ensuring that waste produced is reused, recycled or recovered

There are also a number of other requirements relating to joint responsibilities for both the client and principal contractor. Failure to comply with this schedule is also an offence.

Enforcement and penalties
The Environment Agency and local government or council enforcement officers will enforce these regulations.

A person found guilty of an offence is liable, on summary conviction to a fine not exceeding £50,000 or on indictment to an unlimited fine. Where a corporate body is guilty of an offence, individual liability also applies to directors, managers and other persons acting in a similar capacity.

The enforcement body may also issue a £300 fixed penalty notice if any person fails to produce a site waste management plan or any other record when required to do so by an enforcement officer.

Source: Brian, M (2008) The Site Waste Management Plans Regulations 2008, Regulatory Update, Compliance, (online) www.wastefile.com/news.Site Waste Management Plan Regulations 2008 (Accessed 04/02/2008)

Statutory Instruments of the United Kingdom
2008 in British law